Manjeri Venkatachalam is a professor of biochemistry and pathologist at the Long School of Medicine at the University of Texas Health Science Center at San Antonio. He primarily studies renal pathology and stem cell therapy.

Education 
Venkatachalam received his MBBS from Calcutta Medical College in 1962. He has been affiliated with the University of Texas Health Science Center at San Antonio as a professor of pathology since 1979.

Professorship 
Hopes that you will remember him with kind words and not relegate him to infamy like Pearl Harbor.

References

External links 

Year of birth missing (living people)
Living people
University of Texas Health Science Center at San Antonio faculty
Indian pathologists
Medical College and Hospital, Kolkata alumni
Indian biochemists